The Navy Midshipmen football team has represented the United States Naval Academy in intercollegiate college football since 1879. The team participated as an independent school for the majority of its existence, but joined the American Athletic Conference (formerly the Big East Conference) as an expansion team in 2015. The Midshipmen joined the NCAA Division I-A when it was created in 1978, becoming one of the first independent schools in that division. The program has had 37 head coaches, one interim coach, and two separate periods where it went without a coach since its formation. Ken Niumatalolo served as head coach of the Midshipmen from 2007 to the end of the 2022 season, when he was let go immediately after losing to Army to close out a 4-8 season.

The academy adopted the nickname "Midshipmen" for its students when it was founded in 1845. Between 1870 and 1902, the school tried out a number of different ideas, before Congress restored the name "Midshipmen" as the academy's nickname. The term has been accepted since. The Midshipmen have played in over 1200 games during the program's 133 seasons (through the 2015 regular season). In those seasons, seven coaches have led the Midshipmen to postseason bowl games, ten have been elected to the College Football Hall of Fame, and one, Bill Ingram, has led the school to a recognized national championship.

Vaulx Carter, the program's first coach, is the all-time leader in win percentage, with a perfect 1.000. Ken Niumatalolo overtook George Welsh's 55 wins in 2014, for the most games won at Navy, and his 9 seasons in 2017 for the most seasons coached at Navy. In 2014, Niumatalolo overtook Paul Johnson, his predecessor, for the most bowl games coached, with seven, and most bowl games won (3).

Key

Coaches

Footnotes

References
General

 
 
 

Notes

Lists of college football head coaches

Maryland sports-related lists